Aurélien Bayard Chedjou Fongang (born 20 June 1985) is a Cameroonian former professional footballer who played as a centre back for LOSC Lille, Galatasaray, Bursaspor, Adana Demirspor and the Cameroon national team.

Club career
Chedjou signed for Lille at the start of the 2007–08 season, and over five years made over 150 league appearances for the club, helping them to a third Ligue 1 title and Coupe de France success in 2011. He scored his first UEFA Europa League goal on 21 October 2010 against Levski Sofia after a Stéphane Dumont assist to help his team to a 1–0 win.

Chedjou's performances with Lille have led to him being scouted by several prominent European clubs, with both Newcastle United and Valencia declaring their interest in the player.

On 25 May 2013, Chedjou passed his medical and signed for four years with Galatasaray.

In 2013–14, Chedjou played every minute of Galatasaray's UEFA Champions League campaign, scoring in the round of 16 home leg against Chelsea.

Chedjou made 119 appearances during a four-year stint with Galatasaray that saw him win the league title in 2015 and three straight Turkish FA Cup titles in 2014, 2015 and 2016 as well as three Turkish Super Cups in 2013, 2015 and 2016.

In the summer of 2017 Chedjou joined Istanbul Basaksehir on a free transfer. However, he broke his ankle in the pre-season preparatory camp and had to wait for his debut.

On 2 September 2019, he signed two-year contract with Amiens SC.

Club statistics
.

12011 Trophée des Champions notice: Including 1 competitive competitions.

International goals

|-
| 1. || 8 September 2013 || Stade Ahmadou Ahidjo, Yaoundé ||  ||  ||  || 2014 FIFA World Cup qualification
|}

International career
Represented the national team at 2010 Africa Cup of Nations when his team advanced to the quarterfinals. as well as the 2014 World Cup in Brasil.

Honours
Lille
 Ligue 1: 2010–11
 Coupe de France: 2011

Galatasaray
 Süper Lig: 2014–15
 Turkish Cup: 2013–14, 2014–15, 2015–16
 Turkish Super Cup: 2013, 2015, 2016

References

External links

1985 births
Living people
2010 Africa Cup of Nations players
2010 FIFA World Cup players
2014 FIFA World Cup players
2015 Africa Cup of Nations players
AJ Auxerre players
Association football defenders
Association football midfielders
Association football utility players
Bursaspor footballers
Cameroon international footballers
Cameroonian expatriate footballers
Cameroonian expatriate sportspeople in Turkey
Cameroonian footballers
Expatriate footballers in France
Expatriate footballers in Turkey
FC Rouen players
Footballers at the 2008 Summer Olympics
Galatasaray S.K. footballers
İstanbul Başakşehir F.K. players
Kadji Sports Academy players
Ligue 1 players
Lille OSC players
Olympic footballers of Cameroon
Pau FC players
Footballers from Douala
Süper Lig players